Chinchero District is one of seven districts of the Urubamba Province in Peru. It is the location for the proposed Chinchero International Airport, which would serve travelers to the Cusco Region.

Geography 
Other mountains are listed below:

Ethnic groups 
The people that live in the district are mainly indigenous citizens of Quechua descent. Quechua is the language which the majority of the population (81.49%) learnt to speak in childhood, 17.95% of the residents started speaking using the Spanish language (2007 Peru Census).

Climate

Chinchero has a dry-winter subpolar oceanic climate (Köppen climate classification: Cwc), that borders very closely on both a tundra climate (Köppen climate classification: ET), and a cold semi-arid climate (Köppen climate classification: BSk).

Notable residents
The anthropologists Ed and Chris Franquemont lived among the Chinchero people during the 1970s, studying traditional textile production techniques. Their daughter Abby Franquemont, having spent her childhood within a spinning culture, later became a revivalist of hand spinning with the spindle.

See also
 Center for Traditional Textiles of Cusco (Centro de Textiles Tradicionales del Cusco, CTTC)
 Lliklla
 Nilda Callañaupa Alvarez
List of archaeological sites in Peru

References

External links
  Official municipal website